Adhurs ( Marvelous) is a 2010 Indian Telugu-language action comedy film directed by V. V. Vinayak who co-wrote the film with Kona Venkat. Produced by Vallabhaneni Vamsi Mohan, the film stars N. T. Rama Rao Jr. in a dual role alongside Nayantara and Sheela. Mahesh Manjrekar, Ashish Vidyarthi, Brahmanandam, Sayaji Shinde, Nassar and Tanikella Bharani play supporting roles with the music is composed by Devi Sri Prasad with cinematography by Chota K. Naidu and editing by Gowtham Raju.

Plot
Narasimha and Chari are two identical twins who get separated at birth, they replace one child (chari) with another dead child unknown to the mother of the twins by a nurse and old women who happens to be the grandmother of the dead child, the cause for her doing this is that their family can't bear to lose a child third time in a row and the mother of the twins is a lone women doesn't have anyone at her side, financially weak and doesn't have strength to raise the twins at her own, so they do it in thought that it will benefit both of their families. Both of the twins get raised well with love and affection in both families, Narasimha grows up and works as undercover agent to a police officer whose daughter is his girlfriend in order to become a police himself, he gather information about criminal activities in city, follows them and kill them. Chari becomes a Priest because the family he brought up are Brahmins, he works under another priest Bhattachary aka Bhattu as his assistant without taking a penny from 4 years to repay the debt they have taken from him to build their house. One day Bhattacharya tells Chari Despite being too old to get married that he loves a traditional girl named Chandrakala and he takes care of her and mother financially since her father died in thought that she will marry him in future he invests a lot of money in her but chandrakala and her mother doesn't have that thought they only take advantage of it because they have nowhere to go. Bhattu asks for Chari's help to his love and he agrees, In order to impress her he takes her to pub along with Chari at the same time Narasimha also comes to the pub with his girlfriend Nandu. While Chandu dancing with Bhattu a gang misbehaves with her unable to face them to save chandu they leave the pub without telling chari unknown about the incident but the gang follows them and ask him to leave her to them, Narasimha who saw what happened inside the pub gets angrier and beats them all up while Bhattu and Chandu watch in shock, Chandu who thinks that all who did this, who saved her is Chari and falls for him. Dhanraj and Baba are in search of the family of a top army scientist who is Narasimha and Chari's father. As they find him, they force him to invent a target-killing device by kidnapping Narasimha, who is cheated by Nayak for loving his daughter. Narasimha escapes from there, because of which two men go to Chari's house on his engagement day and make a deal that if Chari acts as Narasimha, they would give him 30 lakhs. What happens next forms the rest of the story.

Cast

 N. T. Rama Rao Jr. in a dual role as Narasimha and Narasimha Chari "Chari"
 Nayantara as Chandrakala "Chandhu"
 Sheela as Nandhu
 Brahmanandam as Bhattacharya "Bhattu"
 Mahesh Manjrekar as Don Baba
 Ashish Vidyarthi as Dhanraj
 Sayaji Shinde as Naik, a police officer, Nandhu's father
 Nassar as Retired Major-turned-Scientist, Narasimha and Chari's father
 Vinaya Prasad as Narasimha and Chari's mother
 Tanikella Bharani as Chari's adoptive father
 Rajyalakshmi as Chari's adoptive mother
 Rama Prabha as Chandrakala's mother
 Mukul Dev as Rasool, a big gang leader
 MS Narayana as Bhasha Bhai
 Raghu Babu as Calcutta Meetha, Baba's right hand
 Supreeth Reddy as Pandu
 Sudha as Indira, Naik's wife
 Vatsala Rajagopal as Chari's adoptive grandmother
 Kondavalasa Lakshmana Rao as Roaring Star Roshan Babu
 Ananth Babu as Peri Sastry
 Fish Venkat as Venkat
 Raja Ravindra as Pandu's brother
 Raghu Karumanchi as Pandu's gang member
 Prudhviraj as Police Inspector

Reception
Rediff gave four stars and said, "Brahmanandam is hilarious. Performance-wise, NTR takes the cake. He is simply marvellous as Chari, the Brahmin spouting loud dialogues while his Narasimha is tough yet more sober. NTR presents the contrasts well. All in all, Adhurs is NTR's show all the way!" Sify gave a verdict as "Mass entertainer" and noted, "NTR brings total justice to his dual role as Chari and Narasimha. His characterisation as a Brahmin youth is simply superb and hilarious, but at the same time raking up a controversy with a group of the Brahmins community approaching the State governor Mr. Narasimhan to ban the film. On the other hand, NTR's role as Narasimha as the rugged guy would work well with the mass audience. Nayanthara and Sheela provide the glam quotient while Brahmanandam is hilarious as Bhattu, receiving a big footage which runs into nearly 40 minutes in the film." The Hindu gave a mixed review stating, Ashish Vidyarthi "NTR in two roles is pretty easy with the diction. His dances are amazing and accord the 'mass kick' in the title song that comes before the climax. The humour component is adequately handled by Brahmanandam who hogs the limelight as a Hindu priest."

Music

The soundtrack was composed by Devi Sri Prasad while Aditya Music bagged the audio rights for this film.

Track list

References

External links

2010 films
Films directed by V. V. Vinayak
Films scored by Devi Sri Prasad
Films about twin brothers
Indian action drama films
Twins in Indian films
2010s Telugu-language films
2010 action drama films
Films set in Hyderabad, India
Films set in Kolkata
Films shot in Hyderabad, India
Films shot in Kolkata